New York State Route 287 may refer to:

New York State Route 287 (1930–1970) in Oneida and Herkimer Counties
New York State Route 287 (1970s) in Jefferson County